Swift is a small lunar impact crater that is located in the northwestern part of the Mare Crisium, in the northeast part of the Moon's near side. Within two crater diameters to the south is the larger crater Peirce. It was named after American astronomer Lewis A. Swift. Swift was previously designated Peirce B.

This formation is circular and bowl-shaped, with a small floor at the midpoint of the sloping interior walls. It is a symmetrical crater with little appearance of wear from minor impacts.

This crater has been incorrectly named 'Graham' on some maps.

References

 
 
 
 
 
 
 
 
 
 
 

Impact craters on the Moon